Calumbi  is a city  in the state of Pernambuco, Brazil. The population in 2020, according to the IBGE, was 5,747 inhabitants. The total area is 179.31 km2.

Geography

 State - Pernambuco
 Region - Sertão Pernambucano
 Boundaries - Triunfo and Santa Cruz da Baixa Verde (N); Betânia (S);  Flores   (E);   Serra Talhada  (W)
 Area - 221.04 km2
 Elevation - 446 m
 Hydrography - Pajeú River
 Vegetation - Caatinga Hiperxerófila
 Climate - Semi-arid, hot and dry
 Annual average temperature - 24.8 c
 Distance to Recife - 408 km

Economy

The main economic activities in Calumbi are based in agribusiness, especially the raising of cattle, sheep, goats, and chickens, and plantations of tomatoes and bananas .

Economic indicators

Economy by sector
2006

Health indicators

References

Municipalities in Pernambuco